Movers & Shakers is a 1985 American comedy film distributed by Metro-Goldwyn-Mayer, starring Walter Matthau and directed by William Asher.

The story follows the head of production at a Hollywood studio who wants to make a movie to fulfill a promise made to a dying friend.

The film was written by Charles Grodin, who also appears in the movie. The cast includes Tyne Daly, Gilda Radner, and Vincent Gardenia. Steve Martin makes a cameo appearance as Fabio Longio.

Plot
Hollywood studio mogul Joe Mulholland (Matthau) vows to produce the pet project of a dying acquaintance, who has been trying to find a way to make a film out of a best-selling sex manual. He and screenwriter Herb Derman (Grodin) try to make it happen, but fail in every possible way. Meanwhile, Herb is distracted by his own marital problems.

Cast
 Walter Matthau as Joe Mulholland
 Charles Grodin as Herb Derman
 Vincent Gardenia as Saul Gritz
 Tyne Daly as Nancy Derman
 Bill Macy as Sid Spokane
 Gilda Radner as Livia Machado
 Earl Boen as Marshall
 Michael Lerner as Arnie
 Joe Mantell as Larry
 William Prince as Louis Martin
 Nita Talbot as Dorothy
 Judah Katz as Freddie
 Peter Marc Jacobson as Robin
 Sam Anderson as Ray Berg
 Frances Bay as Betty Gritz
 Luana Anders as Violette
 Eugene Dynarski as Board Member
 Philip Sterling as Executive
 Steve Martin as Fabio Longio
 Penny Marshall as Reva

Production
Charles Grodin recounted the making of this film in his autobiography, It Would Be So Nice if You Weren't Here: in the mid-1970s, Paramount Pictures paid a great amount of money to secure the rights to Alex Comfort's sex manual The Joy of Sex just so it could use the title, which studio executives thought to be highly commercial. In 1978, they hired Grodin to write a script, telling him the movie "could be about anything." Grodin decided to use this exact situation as the premise: a Hollywood writer struggles to write a script based on a sex manual after a big studio acquires the rights. When he finished his first draft, the studio passed and eventually released National Lampoon's Joy of Sex in 1984.

After Paramount put Grodin's script in turnaround in 1978, he was free to offer it to other studios. However, since Paramount held the rights to the title The Joy of Sex, the film was retitled Dreamers. Columbia Pictures showed interest in producing it with Peter Falk playing the leading role as the producer. But when the deal with Columbia fell through, Grodin ended up pitching his screenplay to every Hollywood studio several times over the course of the next seven years. Eventually, director William Asher agreed to make it with a budget of two million dollars if actors and crew would defer salaries. This is why Grodin and Asher share a producers credit on the finished film.

Grodin persuaded some of his actor friends to become involved. He, Steve Martin, Gilda Radner, Penny Marshall and Tyne Daly all agreed to work for the least amount of money the union allowed. Martin did so without even reading the script. When the film was finally green-lit, Grodin received no salary for writing or producing it, only the minimum for working five weeks as an actor: about $5,000 for two years of work (seven years in total since the inception of the project).

When the film was finally ready to go in front of the cameras, original lead actor Peter Falk was no longer available. An unnamed well-known comic actor had to drop out when he didn't pass his insurance physical. At the very last minute, Walter Matthau agreed to star, receiving $1 million, half his usual fee at the time for his work.

Following not very successful preview screenings, the son of MGM executive Greg Morrison suggested narration by Grodin be added to the picture.

MGM initially refused to pay for the picture nor release it, because "it was not of first-class technical quality" and "does not reflect the screenplay." The film finally got a limited release in several large cities across America. However, because of its relatively small budget ($3.5 million) and all-star cast, MGM expected to make money on home video, cable, regular television and foreign sales.

Grodin was extremely unhappy with MGM over their distribution of the picture and  harshly criticized the studio during talk show appearances. Years later, on a depression-themed episode of his CNBC talk show, Grodin cited the failure of this film (along with the subsequent death of his father) as the cause of a long period of depression.

See also
 "Ode", a poem by Arthur O'Shaughnessy credited with popularising the phrase "movers & shakers"

References

External links
 
 
 
 

1985 comedy films
1985 films
Films directed by William Asher
American comedy films
1980s English-language films
Metro-Goldwyn-Mayer films
United Artists films
1980s American films